Åsane Storsenter is a shopping centre in the suburb of Åsane in Bergen, Norway. 
It was established in 2007 when Arken, owned by Steen & Strøm, and Åsane Senter, owned by Nordea Liv, merged in 2007. In January 2012, it consisted of 138 shops. During 2016, the property was acquired by Olav Thon Eiendomsselskap.

References

External links
Official site

Shopping centres in Norway
Buildings and structures in Bergen
1985 establishments in Norway
Shopping malls established in 1985